The Game of Cootie is a children's dice rolling and set collection tabletop game for two to four players. The object is to be the first to build a three-dimensional bug-like object called a "cootie" from a variety of plastic body parts. Created by William Schaper in 1948 and based on the traditional dice game Beetle, the game was launched in 1949 and was commercially successful, with copies totalling more than one million in the first few years. In 1973, Cootie was acquired by Tyco Toys, and, in 1986, by Hasbro subsidiary Milton Bradley. The game was given a new look and continued to enjoy commercial success. Several companies published cootie games in the first half of the twentieth century, but only Schaper's featured a free-standing, three-dimensional cootie. In 2003, Cootie was named to the Toy Industry Association's "Century of Toys List".

Game play
The object of the original 1949 game is to be the first player to build a "cootie" piece by piece from various plastic body parts that include a beehive-like body, a head, antennae, eyes, a coiled proboscis, and six legs.  Body parts are acquired following the player's roll of a dice, with each number on the dice corresponding to one of the body parts. The body corresponds to one, the head to two, three to the antennas (feelers), four to the eye, five to the proboscis (mouth), and six to the leg. The first part to be acquired must be the body, and then the head. All other body parts may then be acquired in any order. When a player acquires a part, an additional throw of the die is allowed in an attempt to acquire another part.  The winner is the first player to completely assemble a cootie.

Etymology
The earliest recorded use of the word "cootie" appears in Albert N. Depew's  World War I memoir, Gunner Depew (1918): "Of course you know what the word 'cooties' means....When you get near the trenches you get a course in the natural history of bugs, lice, rats and every kind of pest that had ever been invented." The word may be derived from Malaysian kutu, a head louse. In North American English, children use the word to refer to a fictitious disease or condition, often infecting members of the opposite sex. Among children, the word  effectively serves as a device for enforcing separation of the sexes.

Design and product history
In 1948, Robbinsdale, Minnesota, postman William H. Schaper whittled a bug-like fishing lure he believed had toy potential, and sold it (and others like it) in his store as a sideline to his homebound business of manufacturing small commercial popcorn machines.  Eventually, he created a game around his creation, and, in 1949, molded it in plastic and formed the W. H. Schaper Mfg. Co. Inc.

Schaper offered Dayton's, a local department store, several Cootie sets on consignment and the game proved a hit, selling 5,592 by the end of 1950.  By 1952, Schaper's company sold 1.2 million Cootie games, and thereafter, a million games a year. By the mid-1960s, Schaper's company was selling more than twenty-five different games from its Golden Valley, Minnesota, headquarters.  In Australia, the game was distributed by Toltoys in the late 60s under the title Creepy Critters. Cootie was one of many revamped traditional games cast in plastic by the Schaper company. Several games had bug titles such as Tickle Bee, Inch Worm, and Tumble Bug.

The company eventually produced Cootie spinoffs such as Giant Cootie and Deluxe 6 Cootie, a game with six cooties instead of four.  In the late 1960s, Sears offered an exclusive Cootie House with a vinyl mat and eight Cooties.

Tyco Toys bought W.H. Schaper Mfg. Co. Inc. in 1973 and manufactured the game with a change in the bug design but little change to the original game rules. In 1986, Hasbro, through its subsidiary Milton Bradley Co., arranged with Tyco Toys Inc. to purchase Cootie and three other games from the Schaper Toy Division of Kusan Inc.  Milton Bradley brought a new look to Cootie with legs that sported in-line skates, sneakers, and other accessories.

Though the Schaper company published other games including Ants in the Pants, Don't Spill the Beans, and Don't Break the Ice,  Cootie remained the company's best seller with over 50 million games sold between 1949 and 2005.

Other cootie games

Schaper's game was not the first based upon the insect known as the "cootie".  The creature was the subject of several tabletop games, mostly pencil and paper games, in the decades of the twentieth century following World War I. The Cootie Game fashioned by the Irvin-Smith Company about 1915 was a hand-held game that involved tilting capsules into a trap over a background illustration depicting a WWI battlefield.

In 1927, the J. H. Warder Company of Chicago released Tu-Tee, and the Charles Bowlby Company released Cootie; though based on a "build a bug" concept similar to Schaper's, both were paper and pencil games.  In 1937, Rork's released The Game of Cootie, and it too was a paper and pencil game.  A paper and pencil party game called Beetle is popular in Britain, and dates from the mid 1940s or earlier.

In 1939, Transogram published Cootie, a game featuring a three-dimensional wooden bug assembled in a die-cut tray.  Schaper's game was the first to employ a fully three-dimensional, free-standing plastic cootie.

Legacy
Schaper's plastic bug has become an icon, and, for some, a symbol for the baby boomer generation.  In 2003, the Toy Industry Association included Cootie on its "Century of Toys List" of the 100 most memorable and most creative toys of the 20th century. A "Cootie" statue was exhibited in Robbinsdale in 2018.

References

Board games introduced in 1949
Children's board games
Milton Bradley Company games
Roll-and-move board games
Schaper Toys games
Tabletop games